Harmon Leon Wages (born May 18, 1946) is an American former college and professional football player who was a running back in the National Football League (NFL) for five seasons during the 1960s and 1970s.  He played college football for the University of Florida, and thereafter, he played professionally for the Atlanta Falcons of the NFL.

Early years 

Wages was born in Jacksonville, Florida in 1946.  He attended Robert E. Lee High School in Jacksonville, where he was a standout quarterback for the Lee Generals high school football team.  In two years as the Generals' starting quarterback, Wages led his team to 8–2 and 7–3 records.  After rushing for nearly 900 yards as a senior, he was named to the all-city and all-state teams.

College career 

Wages accepted an athletic scholarship to attend the University of Florida in Gainesville, Florida, where he was a quarterback for coach Ray Graves' Florida Gators football team from 1965 to 1967.  He was a backup behind Steve Spurrier in 1965 and 1966, and was the periodic starter as a senior in 1967.  Wages graduated from Florida with a bachelor's degree in business administration in 1969.

Professional career 

He was the Falcons' second-string halfback and third-string quarterback. With an injury to the Falcons' starting halfback, Wages began to see playing time. In a single game against the New Orleans Saints played on December 7, 1969, he ran for a 66-yard touchdown, caught an 88-yard reception for a second touchdown, and threw a 16-yard pass for a third touchdown, and the Falcons defeated the Saints 45–17. The three-touchdown day by a single player—one rushing, one receiving and one passing—is one of only seven such "hat trick" performances in the history of the NFL.

Wages finished his five-year NFL career with 332 carries for 1,321 yards and five touchdowns, eighty-five receptions for 765 yards and five touchdowns, and three pass completions in four attempts for fifty yards and a single touchdown.

Life after football 

Wages became a sportscaster for WAGA-TV, then a CBS affiliate (now a Fox-owned station) in Atlanta, Georgia, and then WXIA-TV, Atlanta's NBC affiliate. From an early age, he developed a reputation for, and earned the nickname of "Charmin' Harmon" from high school onward for having the intuitive ability to engage everyone from teammates on the field, to parents of friends, to coaches, to fans, to writers, to newspersons and professors. Wages was convicted in Federal court in Atlanta for misdemeanor possession of cocaine in 1985, and spent three months in prison.  He returned to sports broadcasting at WTLV-TV, the NBC affiliate in Jacksonville, Florida, and current CBS affiliate WGNX-TV (now WANF) in Atlanta.

Wages currently serves as an advisory member of the board of directors of the Police Athletic League of Jacksonville.

See also 

 Florida Gators football, 1960–69
 History of the Atlanta Falcons
 List of Florida Gators in the NFL Draft
 List of University of Florida alumni

References

Bibliography 

 Carlson, Norm, University of Florida Football Vault: The History of the Florida Gators, Whitman Publishing, LLC, Atlanta, Georgia (2007).  .
 Golenbock, Peter, Go Gators!  An Oral History of Florida's Pursuit of Gridiron Glory, Legends Publishing, LLC, St. Petersburg, Florida (2002).  .
 Hairston, Jack, Tales from the Gator Swamp: A Collection of the Greatest Gator Stories Ever Told, Sports Publishing, LLC, Champaign, Illinois (2002).  .
 McCarthy, Kevin M.,  Fightin' Gators: A History of University of Florida Football, Arcadia Publishing, Mount Pleasant, South Carolina (2000).  .
 McEwen, Tom, The Gators: A Story of Florida Football, The Strode Publishers, Huntsville, Alabama (1974).  .
 Nash, Noel, ed., The Gainesville Sun Presents The Greatest Moments in Florida Gators Football, Sports Publishing, Inc., Champaign, Illinois (1998).  .

1946 births
Living people
American football running backs
Atlanta Falcons announcers
Atlanta Falcons players
Florida Gators football players
National Football League announcers
Robert E. Lee High School (Jacksonville) alumni
Players of American football from Jacksonville, Florida